Unchained is an EP by Canadian heavy metal band Thor. The album's title is taken from the Italian-French epic fantasy feature film Hercules Unchained (1959). Tracks "Rock the City" and "When Gods Collide" were later re-recorded for the album Only the Strong (1985). The EP was reissued on both CD and vinyl with bonus material in 2015. The CD comes with 12 rare bonus tracks, including the ultra-rare 1982 Unchained master recordings, and a bonus DVD containing two full hours of metal mayhem, featuring the “Anger” concept video with behind-the-scenes footage as well as vintage concert performances from 1982-85. A special limited edition vinyl release comes in either blue or orange colored vinyl, includes the 1982 masters, and also contains a 20-page comic book reproducing the original Unchained comic, plus additional unpublished art.

Critical Reception
Reviews of the EP have been more positive than their debut. Off of heavy metal overload, a positive review said that "Unchained is even catchier than the debut and tracks like Anger, Lightning Strikes Again and When Gods Collide are instant favourites and mandatory listening for any true metal party!" 
Reviewer Daniel Pavlica of TheRockologist spoke highly when reviewing the 2015 reissue, praising the bonus content. "Needless to say, the corny balls-to-the-wall approach infects this release at every level, yet spiteful riffs and inspired chord progressions raise the bar well above the tacky 80s fist-pumping metal jolly-up." They followed that up with praising such tracks as the "smashing" opener “Lightning Strikes”, the "colossal sounding" “When Gods Collide”, and “Anger”, calling the latter a "sweat-soaked dungeons and dragons anthem replete with rock hard abs." A reviewer from Popshifter gave a decent review, stating that "Fans of classic metal will love Unchained and it might convert a few who aren’t. I can sum the album up easily as simply a fun listen."

Track listing 

Tracks 7-12 omitted from 2015 vinyl release.

Personnel 
Thor
 Jon Mikl Thor – lead vocals
 Karl Cochran – lead guitar
 Keith Zazzi – bass
 Mike Favata – drums
 Pantera (aka Rusty Hamilton) – backing vocals

Session members
 Jimmy Ambrose – guitar
 Jimmy Whang – guitar
 John Muller – keyboards

Miscellaneous staff
 Jon Mikl Thor – producer, arrangements
 Don Berman - engineering
 Michael Morley - engineering
 Dom Romeo - mastering

References

External links

1983 EPs
Thor (band) albums